MY-5445 is a relatively specific phosphodiesterase 5 inhibitor.

See also
 Vatalanib — a structurally related angiogenesis inhibitor

References

Phosphodiesterase inhibitors
Phthalazines
Chloroarenes